Surnadalsøra is a village in Surnadal Municipality in Møre og Romsdal county, Norway.  It is located at the end of the Surnadalsfjorden, near the mouth of the river Surna.  It is located just southwest of the villages of Sylte and Skei.

Surnadalsøra is combined with the neighboring village of Skei as an "urban area" by Statistics Norway.

References

Surnadal
Villages in Møre og Romsdal